Allan John Jeayes (19 January 1885 – 20 September 1963) was an English stage and film actor.

Jeayes was born in Barnet, Hertfordshire, the son of Isaac Herbert Jeayes, archivist and Assistant Keeper of Manuscripts at the British Museum.

Jeayes was educated at Merchant Taylor's School, and was originally a farmer, before making his stage debut in 1906.

Jeayes made his film debut in the 1918 film Nelson as Sir William Hamilton. He appeared in a number of films by producer Alexander Korda. His last film appearance was in 1962's Reach for Glory. He starred as Howard Joyce in the original 1927 Broadway production of The Letter and played Sir Lawrence Wargarve in the 1943 London production of And Then There Were None.

Jeayes died on 20 September 1963, aged 78, in Marylebone, London.

The National Portrait Gallery, London, has two photographic portraits of him.

Filmography

 Nelson (1918) as Sir William Hamilton (film debut)
 The Solitary Cyclist (1921, Short) as Woodly
 A Gentleman of France (1921) as Henry of Navarre
 The Hound of the Baskervilles (1921) as Dr. James Mortimer
 The Missioner (1922) as Gilbert Deyes
 The Third Round (1925) as Carl Peterson
 The Hate Ship (1929) as Dr. Saunders
 The Ghost Train (1931) as Dr. Sterling
 Stranglehold (1931) as King
 Above Rubies (1932, Short) as Lamont
 The Impassive Footman (1932) as John Marwood
 Anne One Hundred (1933) as Penvale
 Purse Strings (1933) as Walford
 Paris Plane (1933) as Minor Role
 Song of the Plough (1933) as Joe Saxby
 Little Napoleon (1933, Short) as Shenstone 
 Eyes of Fate (1933) as Knocker
 Ask Beccles (1933) as Matthew Blaise
 The Rise of Catherine the Great (1934) as Colonel Karnilov
 Colonel Blood (1934) as Charles II
 Red Ensign (1934) as Grierson
 The Camels are Coming (1934) as Sheikh
 The Scarlet Pimpernel (1934) as Lord Grenville
 Sanders of the River (1935) as Father O'Leary
 Drake of England (1935) as Don Bernardino
 The Tunnel (1935) as Steel Magnate (uncredited)
 Koenigsmark (1935) as Grand Duke Rodolphe
 King of the Damned (1935) as Dr. Prada
 Things to Come (1936) as Mr. Cabal (uncredited)
 Forget Me Not (1936) as London Theatre Manager
 Seven Sinners (1936) as Heinrich Wagner
 Crown v. Stevens (1936) as Inspector Carter
 The House of the Spaniard (1936) as Don Pedro de Guzman
 Rembrandt (1936) as Doctor Tulp
 His Lordship (1936) as Barak
 Action for Slander (1937) as Colonel
 Elephant Boy (1937) as Machua Appa
 The High Command (1937) as H.E., the Governor
 Knight Without Armour (1937) as White General
 The Squeaker (1937) as Inspector Elford
 Return of the Scarlet Pimpernel (1937) as Judge of the Tribunal
 The Green Cockatoo (1937) as The Detective Inspector
 I, Claudius (1937, Unreleased) as Musa, the emperor's physician
 13 Men and a Gun (1938) as General Vloty
 Dangerous Medicine (1938) as Supt. Fox
 A Royal Divorce (1938) as Marat
 They Drive by Night (1938) as Wally Mason
 Life of St. Paul (1938, Short) as Minor Role
 Everything Happens to Me (1938)
 Q Planes (1939) as Minor Role (uncredited)
 The Four Feathers (1939) as General Faversham
 Smith (1939, Short) as Employer
 The Stars Look Down (1940) as Richard Barras
 The Proud Valley (1940) as Mr. Trevor
 The Spider (1940) as George Hackett
 Spy for a Day (1940) as Col. Roberts
 The Good Old Days (1940) as Shadwell
 A Window in London (1940) as Sir Edward (uncredited)
 Convoy (1940) as Commander Blount
 Night Train to Munich (1940) as Prisoner in Concentration Camp Lineup (uncredited)
 The Flying Squad (1940) as Johnson
 The Thief of Bagdad (1940) as The Story Teller
 Sailors Three (1940) as British Commander
 You Will Remember (1941) as Signor Foli
 Old Bill and Son (1941) as Willoughby
 Inspector Hornleigh Goes To It (1941) as Brigadier Lloyd (uncredited)
 "Pimpernel" Smith (1941) as Dr Benckendorf
 Uncensored (1942) (uncredited)
 Talk About Jacqueline (1942) (uncredited)
 Tomorrow We Live (1943) as Pogo
 The Shipbuilders (1943) as Ralph
 Dead of Night (1945) as Maurice Olcott (segment "The Ventriloquist's Dummy")
 Perfect Strangers (1945) as Commander
 Lisbon Story (1946) as Dr. Cartier
 The Man Within (1947) as Judge
 Blanche Fury (1948) as Mr. Weatherby
 Saraband for Dead Lovers (1948) as Governor of Ahlden
 Obsession (1949) as Clubman #2
 The Reluctant Widow (1950) as Colonel
 The Song in the Forest (1950, TV Movie) as Emperor Franz Josef
 Waterfront (1950) as Prison officer
 Reach for Glory (1962) as Crabtree (final film)

References

External links

1885 births
1963 deaths
English male film actors
English male stage actors
20th-century British male actors
Male actors from London